Armen is an Armenian given name and surname.

Notable people with the name include:

Given name
Armen Akopyan (born 1980), Ukrainian midfielder
Armen Alchian (1914–2013), American economist
Armen Ambartsumyan (born 1978), Bulgarian-Armenian football goalkeeper
Armen Babalaryan (born 1971), Armenian football midfielder
Armen Bagdasarov (born 1972), Uzbek judoka
Armen Boladian, record producer
Armen Chakmakian (born 1966), Armenian-American musician
Armen Darbinyan (born 1965), Prime Minister of Armenia
Armen Donelian (born 1950), jazz pianist
Armen Dzhigarkhanyan, (1935–2020), an Armenian actor working in Russia
Armen Garo, (1872–1923), an Armenian freedom fighter and politician in Ottoman Turkey, Russian Empire and the First Republic of Armenia
Armen Gilliam (1964–2011), American professional basketball player
Armen Keteyian (born 1953), American television journalist
Armen Martirosyan (disambiguation), multiple people
Armen Mkrtchyan (born 1973), Armenian wrestler
Armen Nalbandian (born 1978), jazz pianist
Armen Nazaryan (born 1974), Armenian/Bulgarian Greco Roman wrestler
Armen Petrosyan (born 1986), Armenian-Italian kickboxer
Armen Ra, an American theremin player
Armen Sargsyan (born 1953), Prime Minister of Armenia
Armen Shahgeldyan (born 1973), Armenian football striker
Armen Tigranyan (born 1985), Armenian football midfielder
Armen Takhtajan (1910–2009), Soviet-Armenian botanist
Armen Terzian (1915—1989), American football official in the National Football League

Surname
Robert Armen (born 1947), a special trial judge of the United States Tax Court
Rosy Armen, Armenian-French singer
Garo H. Armen, (born 1953), a businessperson who co-founded Antigenics

Armenian masculine given names